Group 3 of the 1974 FIFA World Cup was contested between 15 and 23 June 1974. Matches were played in three cities: Dortmund, Hanover and Düsseldorf.

The pool comprised Uruguay (Pot 3-South America), Bulgaria (Pot 2-Eastern Europe), Netherlands (Pot 1-Western Europe) and Sweden (Pot 4-Rest of the world).

Standings

Matches
All times listed are local (CET)

Uruguay vs Netherlands

Sweden vs Bulgaria

Bulgaria vs Uruguay

Netherlands vs Sweden

Bulgaria vs Netherlands

Sweden vs Uruguay

External sources
 Sweden-Uruguay, game report
 Bulgaria-Uruguay, game report

1974 FIFA World Cup
Netherlands at the 1974 FIFA World Cup
Uruguay at the 1974 FIFA World Cup
Bulgaria at the 1974 FIFA World Cup
Sweden at the 1974 FIFA World Cup